Antonio Marinetti, also called  il Chiozzotro (Chioggia, born circa 1700) was an Italian painter, active in a late-Baroque style.

Biography
He was a pupil of Giovanni Battista Piazzetta. He painted the main altarpiece for the Church of Sant'Agostino in Treviso, depicting a Virgin and Child with St Augustine and the Blessed Girolamo Miani. Miani was one of the founders of the Order of Somaschi priests. He also painted for the same church, a Guardian Angel and  Glory of St Joseph with Saint Anne and the Holy Family. For the church of San Lorenzo in Treviso, he painted a St Anthony Abbot.

References

Year of birth unknown
Year of death unknown
17th-century Italian painters
Italian male painters
18th-century Italian painters
Painters from Venice
18th-century Italian male artists